Mccoskerichthys sandae, the Tufted blenny, is a species of chaenopsid blenny, found around Costa Rica and Panama, in the eastern central Pacific ocean. It can reach a maximum length of  TL. This species feeds primarily on small crustaceans including copepods, amphipods, and ostracods.  It is the only known member of its genus. The generic name honours the zoologist John E. McCosker, who discovered this blenny and who assisted in the collection of the type and the specific name honours his then wife, Sandra.

References
 Rosenblatt, R. H.  and J. S. Jr. Stephens  1978 (15 May) Mccoskerichthys sandae, a new and unusual chaenopsid blenny from the Pacific coast of Panama and Costa Rica. Contributions in Science (Los Angeles) No. 293: 1-22.

Chaenopsidae
Monotypic fish genera
Taxa named by Richard Heinrich Rosenblatt
Fish described in 1978